= Shell Company =

Shell Company may refer to:

- Shell corporation, a dormant company
- Shell plc, global oil company
